The 2011–12 Indiana State Sycamores men's basketball team represented Indiana State University during the 2011–12 NCAA Division I men's basketball season. The Sycamores, led by second year head coach Greg Lansing, played their home games at the Hulman Center and are members of the Missouri Valley Conference. They finished the season 18–15, 8–10 in MVC play to finish in eighth place. The lost in the quarterfinals of the Missouri Valley Basketball tournament to Wichita State. They were invited to the 2012 CollegeInsider.com Tournament where they lost in the first round to Robert Morris.

Roster

Schedule

|-
!colspan=9| Exhibition

|-
!colspan=9| Regular season

|-
!colspan=9| Missouri Valley Conference tournament

|-
!colspan=9| 2012 CIT

References

Indiana State Sycamores men's basketball seasons
Indiana State
Indiana State
Indiana State Sycamores men's basketball
Indiana State Sycamores men's basketball